Camillus Nyrop (18 February 1811 - 24 December 1883) was a Danish instrumentmaker and bandagist. He was the founder of Camillus Nyrops Etablissement, Denmark's first manufacturer of surgical instruments and artificial lims.

Early life and education
Nyrop was born on 18 February 1811 in Riserup on Falster, the son of provost Christopher Ntrop (1752-1831) and his second wife Cathrine Elisabeth Magdalene Heilmann (1765-1842). He was an apprentice in court turner ]J. G. Schwartz's workshop in 1816–22. He had already at this point started to take an interest in surgical instruments.  In 1833  he was articled to J. H. Hüttemeier to improve his knowledge of metalwork while at the same time studying under Hans Christian Ørsted at the College of Advanced Technology. After that he went abroad to further his study of surgical instruments since such the most of these had until then all been imported. He initially went to Berlin and Vienna before arriving in Paris in 1836 where he became an apprentice to Joseph-Frédéric-Benoît Charrière and collaborated with leading French surgeons.

Career

Back in Copenhagen in 1838, he immediately started his own production of surgical instruments. His qualifications as an instrument maker and bandagist was soon noticed by the city's medical doctors and surgeons.

He was in 1841 granted status of official instrumentmaker to the Royal Danish Academy of Surgery, and in 1843, after the academy had been merged with the University of Copenhagen's Department of Medicine, he was granted status of university instrument maker. He later went abroad on several occasions, both to update his knowledge of surgical instruments and to become familiar with new areas of the metal industry.
In 1846–50, he operated a tool factory in a partnership with Theodor Marstrand.

Nyrop was aboard member of Industriforeningen from 1843. During the First Schleswig War, 1848–49, he devoted himself to the development of better artificial lims for the many injured soldiers who returned from the war. Several of his inventions wom him international acclaim. Towards the end of his career he increasingly focused on simplifying his surgical armamentarium.

Nyrop published  Bandager og Instrumenter I-III in 1864–77.

Location
The company was based at Købmagergade 43. The building is from 1880 and was designed bhy Ludvig Fenger. The building around the corner at Løvstræde 4 was also built for the company. It was designed by Martin Nyrop.

Personal life and legacy
Nyrop married Karen Christine (Kamma) Andersen (5 March 1822 - 10 December 1893), a daughter of manager of Toldbod Vinhus Hans Andersen (1792-1865) and Juliane Marie Berggreen (c. 1780-1841), on 6 July 1839 in the Garrison Church in Copenhagen.

Nyrop was awarded the Medal of Merit in 1850 and amade a titular professor in 1860. He died on 24 December 1883 and is buried at the Garrison Cemetery in Copenhagen.

His company, Camillus Nyrops Etablissement, was continued by two of his sons, Johan Ernst Nyrop (1850–1931) and Hans Louis Nyrop (1861-1931). It was converted into a limited company (aktieselskab) in 1924 and merged with Hjalmar Maag A/S. Two of his other sons were the industrial historian Camillus Nyrop (1843-1918) and the architect Kristoffer Nyrop.

See also
 Camillus Nyrops Etablissement
 Cornelius Knudsen

References

External links
 Architectural renderings for adaption of Købmagergade 43 for Nyrop (1873)
 Furniture by Martin Borch in the Danish National Art Library

19th-century Danish businesspeople
Danish company founders
Nyrop family
People from Falster
1811 births
1883 deaths